
Polkowice County is a unit of territorial administration and local government (powiat) in Lower Silesian Voivodeship, south-western Poland. It came into being on January 1, 1999, as a result of the Polish local government reforms passed in 1998. Its administrative seat is the town of Polkowice, and it also contains the towns of Chocianów and Przemków.

As of 2019 the total population of the county is 62,948, out of which the population of Polkowice is 22,480, that of Chocianów is 7,892, that of Przemków is 6,107, and the rural population is 26,469.

Neighbouring counties
Polkowice County is bordered by Głogów County to the north, Lubin County to the south-east, Legnica County to the south, Bolesławiec County to the south-west and Żagań County to the west.

Administrative division
The county is subdivided into six gminas (three urban-rural and three rural). These are listed in the following table, in descending order of population.

References

 
Land counties of Lower Silesian Voivodeship